Saint-Antoine is a former commune in the Gironde department in Aquitaine in southwestern France.

Population

See also
Communes of the Gironde department

References

Former communes of Gironde